Fairview Avenue station may refer to:

Fairview Avenue station (Illinois), a commuter rail station on the Metra in Downers Grove, Illinois, USA
Fairview Avenue station (Metro Transit), a light rail station on the METRO Green Line in Saint Paul, Minnesota, USA